Engelhart is a surname.  Notable people with this surname include:

Alette Engelhart, a Norwegian housewives' leader
Billy Engelhart,  an American driver in the CART Championship Car series
Catherine Engelhart Amyot, a Danish painter
Christian Engelhart, a German racing driver
Edwin Engelhart, a Dutch professional basketball player
Nils Engelhart, a Norwegian Lutheran priest
Stanley Engelhart, an English athlete
Thomas Engelhart, a Norwegian jurist and politician

See also:
Englehart
Engelhardt
Engelhard (disambiguation)